Honghudonglu station is a metro station on the Loop Line of Chongqing Rail Transit in Yubei District of Chongqing Municipality, China.

It serves the area surrounding Honghu East Road, including the Chongqing Foreign Affairs Office and its service hall, nearby office buildings and residential blocks.

The station opened on 28th of December, 2018.

Station Structure

Floors

Notes:
Exit 1B opened on 3 December 2019
As of January 2020, only the elevator connecting the station concourse and the platform is in use, whereas the 2 other elevators connecting the station with the surface are under construction

Loop Line Platform
Platform Layout
An island platform is used for Loop Line trains travelling in both directions. The station can act as a reversing station using its crossover rail for trains to switch direction. It can also be used to store trains.

The train junction is located at the right side of this diagram

Exits
There are a total of 4 entrances/exits for the station.

Surroundings

Nearby Places
Honghu East Road
Chongqing Foreign Affairs Service Hall
Fortune Mall
Fortune Plaza
Longfor Xiyuan
Longfor Fragrant Garden

Nearby Stations
Min'an Avenue station (a Loop Line & Line 4 Station)
Dongbu Park station (a Loop Line station)

See also
Chongqing Rail Transit (CRT)
Loop Line (CRT)

References

Railway stations in Chongqing
Railway stations in China opened in 2018
Chongqing Rail Transit stations